Myripristis randalli is a species of soldierfish belonging to the genus Myripristis. It can be found in the Eastern Central Pacific Ocean in Tonga, American Samoa, Pitcairn and the Austral Islands, and also in Taiwan. It is named after ichthyologist John Ernest Randall.

References

randalli
Fish of the Pacific Ocean
Taxa named by David Wayne Greenfield